Tokyo.sora is a 2002 Japanese drama film directed by Hiroshi Ishikawa.

Cast
 Yuka Itaya
 Haruka Igawa
 Ayano Nakamura

References

External links
 

2002 films
Japanese drama films
2002 drama films
Films directed by Hiroshi Ishikawa
2000s Japanese films